Remember Me? is a 1997 comedy film directed by Nick Hurran and starring Imelda Staunton and Robert Lindsay.

Cast
Imelda Staunton as Lorna
Robert Lindsay as Jamie 
Natalie Walter as Georgina
Rik Mayall as Ian
Emily Bruni as Jessica 
Olegar Fedoro as Gangster

References

External links

1997 films
Films directed by Nick Hurran
Films scored by Michael Kamen
Films scored by Edward Shearmur
British comedy films
1997 comedy films
1997 directorial debut films
1990s English-language films
1990s British films